Finley Johnson Shepard (October 8, 1867 – August 22, 1942) was an American executive at the Missouri Pacific Railroad.

He was born n Manhattan, New York City. He married Helen Miller Gould, the daughter of Jay Gould. He died on August 22, 1942 at Roosevelt Hospital in Manhattan, New York City.

References

External links

1867 births
1942 deaths
Gould family